Alfred Roch (born 8 June 1925) is a Swiss former cross-country skier who competed in the 1950s. He finished 16th in the 50 km event at the 1952 Winter Olympics in Oslo.

References

External links
 

1925 births
Living people
Cross-country skiers at the 1952 Winter Olympics
Olympic cross-country skiers of Switzerland
Swiss male cross-country skiers